Everyone Is Here is the second album by The Finn Brothers, a music project of New Zealand brothers Tim and Neil Finn.

The album was recorded twice, once in upstate New York with famed Bowie producer Tony Visconti, then again six months later in Los Angeles with Crowded House stalwart Mitchell Froom. Some of the songs from the first recording session were kept as B sides and later appeared on a special edition of the album.

"Won't Give In" was featured on the soundtrack to the film Because of Winn-Dixie. "Luckiest Man Alive" was used in the closing to the 2005 Indianapolis 500 in response to Danica Patrick's performance in that event.

Track listing

2005 special edition

Charts

Certifications

References

2004 albums
2005 albums
Tim Finn albums
Neil Finn albums
Albums produced by Mitchell Froom
Albums produced by Jon Brion
Albums produced by Tony Visconti
Parlophone albums
Nettwerk Records albums